UFC on ESPN: Eye vs. Calvillo (also known as UFC on ESPN 10 and UFC Vegas 2) was a mixed martial arts event produced by the Ultimate Fighting Championship that took place on June 13, 2020 at the UFC Apex facility in Enterprise, Nevada, part of the Las Vegas Metropolitan Area, United States.

Background
This event was initially planned to take place at Astana Arena in Nur-Sultan, Kazakhstan and would have been the first that the promotion had contested there. However, it was announced by UFC president Dana White on April 9 that starting with UFC 249, all future events were indefinitely postponed due to the COVID-19 pandemic.

While not officially announced by the organization, the promotion was targeting a bantamweight bout between former WSOF Bantamweight Champion and UFC Bantamweight Championship challenger Marlon Moraes and Petr Yan to serve as the original event headliner. The pairing was scrapped after it was confirmed that the event would no longer take place in Kazakhstan.

Subsequently, a women's flyweight bout between former UFC Women's Flyweight Championship challenger Jessica Eye and Cynthia Calvillo served as the new event headliner for Las Vegas. The event streamed on ESPN+ and aired on ESPN.

Due to the event being relocated to the United States, some changes were made as several fighters were unable to compete due to travel restrictions related to the COVID-19 pandemic:
A light heavyweight bout between Roman Dolidze and Khadis Ibragimov was postponed and rescheduled for July 18 at UFC Fight Night: Figueiredo vs. Benavidez 2.
A flyweight bout between promotional newcomer Zhalgas Zhumagulov and Jordan Espinosa was initially scheduled for the event when it was targeted for Kazakhstan. However, due to travel restrictions related to COVID-19 pandemic, Zhumagulov was removed from the card after the event was moved to Las Vegas. Espinosa instead would face Mark De La Rosa in a bantamweight bout.

Additionally, the event included fighters that were pulled from other events previously cancelled, as well as the following bouts:

A middleweight bout between Karl Roberson and Marvin Vettori (originally scheduled for UFC Fight Night: Smith vs. Teixeira, but Roberson pulled out due to issues related to his failed weight cut).
A women's bantamweight bout between Julia Avila and Karol Rosa. The pairing was expected to meet at UFC Fight Night: Maia vs. Askren in October 2019, but Rosa pulled out due to a knee injury. They were later rescheduled for UFC Fight Night: Overeem vs. Harris and UFC Fight Night: Hermansson vs. Weidman, but both times the bout was postponed due to the COVID-19 pandemic. They were later booked for this event, but the bout was canceled for the fourth time as Rosa had visa issues. She was replaced by Gina Mazany.
A women's flyweight bout between former KSW Women's Flyweight Champion Ariane Lipski and Luana Carolina (originally scheduled for UFC on ESPN: Overeem vs. Harris). Subsequently, the pairing was delayed a second time and was rescheduled for July 18 at UFC Fight Night: Figueiredo vs. Benavidez 2 due to travel restrictions for both fighters.

A women's flyweight bout between Melissa Gatto and Mariya Agapova was scheduled for the event, but Gatto pulled out on June 7 due to visa issues. She was replaced by Hannah Cifers.

A flyweight bout between Tyson Nam and Ryan Benoit was scheduled for the event. However, Benoit withdrew due to undisclosed reasons and was replaced by promotional newcomer Zarrukh Adashev, thus changing the contest to the bantamweight division.

A bantamweight bout between former UFC Flyweight Championship challenger Ray Borg and Merab Dvalishvili was scheduled for the event. However, Borg withdrew from the event for personal reasons and was replaced by promotional newcomer Gustavo Lopez. The bout took place at a catchweight of 140 pounds.

Before the weigh-ins, Darrick Minner was pulled from his bout with Jordan Griffin due to unspecified health issues and the bout was cancelled.

At the weigh-ins, Eye, Roberson and Adashev all missed weight for their respective bouts. Eye weighed in at 126.25 pounds, a quarter pound over the flyweight non-title fight limit. Roberson weighed in at 190.5 pounds, four and a half pounds over the middleweight non-title fight limit and Adashev weighed in at 138.5 pounds, two and a half pounds over the bantamweight non-title fight limit. Their bouts proceeded at a catchweight and they were respectively fined 25%, 30% and 20% of their individual purses, which went to their opponents Calvillo, Vettori and Nam.

Results

Bonus awards
The following fighters received $50,000 bonuses.
Fight of the Night: No bonus awarded.
Performance of the Night: Marvin Vettori, Mariya Agapova, Tyson Nam and Christian Aguilera

Reported payout
The following is the reported payout to the fighters as reported to the Nevada State Athletic Commission (NSAC). It does not include sponsor money and also does not include the UFC's traditional "fight night" bonuses. The total disclosed payout for the event was $782,000.
 Cynthia Calvillo: $122,750 (includes $55,000 win bonus) def. Jessica Eye: $38,250 ^
 Marvin Vettori: $98,000 (includes $43,000 win bonus) def. Karl Roberson: $28,000 ^
 Charles Rosa: $68,000 (includes $34,000 win bonus) def. Kevin Aguilar: $25,000
 Andre Fili: $110,000 (includes $55,000 win bonus) def. Charles Jourdain: $16,000
 Jordan Espinosa: $24,000 (includes $12,000 win bonus) def. Mark De La Rosa: $21,000
 Mariya Agapova: $20,000 (includes $10,000 win bonus) def. Hannah Cifers: $35,000
 Merab Dvalishvili: $46,000 (includes $23,000 win bonus) def. Gustavo Lopez: $12,000
 Julia Avila: $24,000 (includes $12,000 win bonus) def. Gina Mazany: $16,000
 Tyson Nam: $30,800 (includes $14,000 win bonus) def. Zarrukh Adashev: $11,200 ^
 Christian Aguilera: $24,000 (includes $12,000 win bonus) def. Anthony Ivy: $12,000

^ Eye ($12,750), Roberson ($12,000) and Adashev ($2,800) were respectively fined 25%, 30% and 20% of their purses for failing to make the required weight limit for each of their respective fights. That money was issued to their opponents, a NSAC official confirmed.

See also 

 List of UFC events
 List of current UFC fighters
 2020 in UFC

References 

UFC on ESPN
2020 in mixed martial arts
2020 in sports in Nevada
Mixed martial arts in Las Vegas
Sports competitions in Las Vegas
June 2020 sports events in the United States